Agilan, also known as Agilan: King of the Indian Ocean  is a 2023 Indian Tamil-language neo-noir action thriller film directed by N. Kalyanakrishnan. The film stars Jayam Ravi in dual roles as a father and son, along with Priya Bhavani Shankar and Tanya Ravichandran in the lead roles. Sam C. S. composed the film’s soundtrack while Screen Scene Media Entertainment produced the film.

The film was initially scheduled to be released theatrically on 15 September 2022 although the release date was postponed, but it was released on 10 March 2023.

Premise 
Agilan is a crane operator, who is also a smuggler at an harbor in Chennai. He works for Paranthaman, who runs a small-time smuggling business. Being ambitious by nature, Agilan strikes a deal with an entrepreneur named Kapoor and is assigned to deport a man who holds confidential secrets of various countries. He also faces trouble from a jealous Paranthaman and Inspector Gokul Mehta, who want to catch and arrest him for his work as a smuggler.

Cast

Production
The film was tentatively titled as JR28. Later, the title of the film was announced to be Agilan. Jayam Ravi, will be playing the role of a marine engineer in this film. Priya Bhavani Shankar was chosen as the female leads in this film marking her first collaboration with Jayam Ravi. Other actors and actresses like Tanya Ravichandran, Chirag Jani, and Harish Uthaman etc where chosen to play pivotal roles in the film. The shooting of the film was wrapped up on 27 May 2022.

Music

The film’s music will be composed by Sam C. S. which also marks his Second collaboration with Jayam Ravi after Adanga Maru. The first single titled "Dhrogam" was released on 27 February 2023.

Release

Theatrical 
The film was released theatrically on 10 March 2023. Overseas Released by Ayngaran International

Home Media
The streaming and satellite rights of the film were bought by ZEE5 and Kalaignar TV.

Reception 
Agilan received mixed reviews from critics.

Gopinath Rajendran of The Hindu wrote "Watching Agilan is the equivalent of being thrown into the middle of choppy waters — you’re trying to keep yourself conscious but wave after wave of randomness keeps hitting you, tiring you to even hope for some respite." Maalai Malar gave 3.5 out of 5 stars and wrote "In the first half, the screenplay is lively and interesting, and in the second half, the action is mixed." Logesh Balachandran of The Times of India gave 2.5 out of 5 stars and wrote "Although Agilan has the usual commercial tropes we've seen before, its backdrop makes it slightly more interesting. While the film is watchable, the second half fails to satisfy the audience's expectations." Dina Thanthi  wrote "Director Kalyana Krishnan has shown the other side of the treacherous world of sea, ships and selfishness of people in a one-line story about how the life of the grassroots is crushed by the shenanigans behind the maritime trade."

References

Indian action thriller films
2020s Tamil-language films
Indian action films
Films scored by Sam C. S.